Dora Yu (1873–1931) was a prominent Chinese evangelist in China in the first part of 20th century.

Biography 
Yu was trained in western medicine in Suzhou, which she practiced briefly. She also took her medical training for work in evangelism. As a Bible woman, Yu and Josephine Campbell in 1897 became the first two female medical missionaries from the Southern Methodist Church to do work in Korea.

After working in Korea for six years, Yu returned to China and became a well-known revivalist preacher. She was invited to preach in many parts of China and, in 1927, spoke at the Keswick Convention in northern England. Her preaching was said to have had a great impact on many Chinese, who devoted their lives to Christian work. For instance, in a 1920 revival meeting in Church of Heavenly Peace, Fuzhou, Yu influenced a woman by the name of Lin Heping (Peace Lin) to have a conversion experience and, a few months later, also Lin's son, Watchman Nee, both of whom would become well-known revivalists themselves.

Writings 
 Yu, Dora. God's Dealings with Dora Yü, a Chinese messenger of the Cross. London: Morgan and Scott, 1928.

References

Further reading
 Wu, Silas H. L. Dora Yu and Christian Revival in 20th-Century China. Boston, MA: Pishon River Publications, 2002. .
 吳秀良 (Wu, Xiuliang). 復興先鋒 : 余慈度舆廿世紀的中國教會 (Fu Xing Xian Feng: Yu Cidu Yu Nian Shi Ji De Zhongguo Jiao Hui). Boston, MA.: Bixun He chu ban she, 2004.

1873 births
1931 deaths
Chinese Protestant ministers and clergy
Christian writers
Chinese evangelists
Chinese spiritual writers
Writers from Hangzhou